Hesperumia latipennis is a moth of the family Geometridae first described by George Duryea Hulst in 1896. It is found in western North America from British Columbia south to California.

The wingspan is 34–36 mm. The forewings are pale gray with a narrow dentate median line and numerous scattered brown scales. The hindwings are similar in color and pattern. Populations from the Cascade Range tend to be slightly grayer and have more clearly defined maculation (spots) than specimens from the coastal areas of British Columbia, Washington and central California.

Adults are on wing from May to August.

The larvae feed on various trees and shrubs, including Rhamnus purshiana, Holodiscus discolor, Sambucus species and Symphoricarpos albus.

References

External links

Boarmiini